Dolmabahçe Clock Tower is a clock tower situated outside Dolmabahçe Palace in Istanbul, Turkey. Its construction was ordered by Ottoman sultan Abdülhamid II (1842–1918) and designed by the court architect Sarkis Balyan between 1890 and 1895.

The clock tower was added to Dolmabahçe Palace, and stands in front of its Treasury Gate on a square along the European waterfront of Bosphorus next to Dolmabahçe Mosque. Its clock was manufactured by the renowned French clockmaker house of Jean-Paul Garnier, and installed by the court clock master Johann Mayer. Its face features highly stylised Eastern Arabic numerals. In 1979, the original mechanical clock was converted partly to an electrical one. Two opposing sides of the tower bear the tughra of Sultan Abdul Hamid II.

See also
List of columns and towers in Istanbul
Yıldız Clock Tower
Etfal Hospital Clock Tower
İzmir Clock Tower
İzmit Clock Tower

References

External links

Towers completed in 1895
Sarkis Balyan buildings
Towers in Istanbul
Clock towers in Turkey
Bosphorus
Ottoman architecture in Istanbul
Baroque Revival architecture in Turkey
Beşiktaş
Tourist attractions in Istanbul
Ottoman clock towers
1895 establishments in the Ottoman Empire